The Suspect is a 1998 Hong Kong action film written and directed by Ringo Lam and starring Louis Koo, Julian Cheung, Simon Yam, Ray Lui, Ada Choi and Eric Moo

Plot
Twelve years ago in 1986, Don (Louis Koo) was imprisoned due to murder and the fact he did not testify against the mastermind Dante (Simon Yam) and his friend Max (Julian Cheung), who was also involved of committing the crime. Twelve years later, Don is released from prison and decides not to repeat the same mistakes and make a fresh start. However, Don receives a sudden call from Dante and Max, who force him to assassinate the candidate running for the president of the Philippines. Don rejects their request, but later discovers that the target has been assassinated. Don realizes he has been framed by Dante and begins to exile. Later, with the help of King Tso (Ray Lui), a legion soldier who was hired to take down the murderer, and Annie (Ada Choi), a female reporter, Don reveals the evidence of Dante's crime and clears himself.

Cast
Louis Koo as Don Lee
Julian Cheung as Max Mak
Simon Yam as Dante Aquino
Ray Lui as King Tso
Ada Choi as Annie Chung
Eric Moo as Policeman
Philip Ko as Aquino's henchman
Johnny Cheung as Gary
Raven Choi
Iris Chai
Fok Wing-fu as Aquino's henchman
Mike Cassey as TV news reporter
Tang Cheung
Leung Ka-hei as Ray / Ah Hei

Reception

Critical
Love HK Film gave the film a mixed review describing it as being "more competent than spectacular, which registers the film as an eventual disappointment."

Box office
The film grossed HK$4,497,310 at the Hong Kong box office during its theatrical run from 16 July to 5 August 1998 in Hong Kong.

References

External links

The Suspect at Hong Kong Cinemagic

1998 films
1998 action thriller films
1998 crime thriller films
Hong Kong action thriller films
Hong Kong crime thriller films
Gun fu films
1990s Cantonese-language films
Films directed by Ringo Lam
Films set in Hong Kong
Films shot in Hong Kong
Films set in the Philippines
Films shot in the Philippines
1990s Hong Kong films